The 1887 St Ives by-election was held on 9 July 1887 after the incumbent Liberal Unionist MP, Sir John St Aubyn being elevated to the Peerage.  The seat was retained by the Liberal Unionist candidate, Thomas Bedford Bolitho, who was unopposed.

References

By-elections to the Parliament of the United Kingdom in Cornish constituencies
Unopposed by-elections to the Parliament of the United Kingdom in English constituencies
July 1887 events
1887 elections in the United Kingdom
1887 in England
19th century in Cornwall
St Ives, Cornwall